Mississippi Highway 495 (MS 495) is a state highway in eastern Mississippi running just under  in length. Traveling through northern Lauderdale County and western Kemper County, it was created in 1957 and has remained on its original alignment since then.

Route description
MS 495 begins at the settlement of Bailey at a T-intersection with MS 493. The two-lane road briefly heads west before turning to the north. It passes small housing developments, individual houses, and churches as it heads through rural northwestern Lauderdale County. At Center Hill, MS 495 passes Center Hill Martin Road which provides access to Okatibbee Dam and its associated park and lake, a gas station, and West Lauderdale Elementary School. As the road crosses into Kemper County, it heads to a more forested area passing fewer houses and settlements. About  after crossing the county line, MS 495 reaches MS 16 at a T-intersection. MS 495 breaks off the concurrency to head north again through wooded areas but with some farm fields present along the road. It passes to the west of Joe Williams Field, an auxiliary air field of Naval Air Station Meridian and makes sharper curves through this area. It eventually curves more to the northeast to end at MS 397 south of the community of Preston.

History
MS 495 was created in 1957 running along the alignment it runs today to the west of MS 493. It had originally been constructed as an unimproved road, it was not fully paved until 1974.

Major intersections

References

External links

495
Transportation in Lauderdale County, Mississippi
Transportation in Kemper County, Mississippi